University Field was a stadium in Princeton, New Jersey which opened in 1876 through a gift by William Libbey, then a student at the College of New Jersey (renamed Princeton University in 1896).  It hosted the Princeton University Tigers football team until they moved to Palmer Stadium in 1914. It was home to the Princeton baseball team from its opening until 1960, when the field was replaced by Princeton's Engineering Quad. The stadium held 20,000 people at its peak.

References

External links
 Stadium information

College baseball venues in the United States
Defunct college football venues
Princeton Tigers baseball
Princeton Tigers football
American football venues in New Jersey
Baseball venues in New Jersey
1876 establishments in New Jersey
Sports venues completed in 1876
1960 disestablishments in New Jersey
Sports venues demolished in 1960
Demolished sports venues in New Jersey